Dame Rita Mary Buxton, DBE (21 November 1896 – 22 August 1982) was an Australian community worker, activist, racehorse owner and philanthropist.

Background and family
Born at South Yarra, Melbourne, the only child of Charles James Neunhoeffer (or Neunhoffer) and Emma Alice O'Connor, she was educated at Sacré Coeur convent school, Glen Iris. Her father was a civil servant turned entrepreneur, becoming the proprietor of Canada Cycle & Motor Co. (Victoria) Pty Ltd, motorcar importers.

Marriage
On the day after her 26th birthday (22 November 1922), at St Joseph's Catholic Church, Malvern she married Leonard Raymond Buxton (1896-1977).

St Vincent's
In 1927 Rita Buxton joined the Toorak auxiliary of St Vincent's Hospital, Fitzroy. By 1936 she was president of the central executive of the hospital's auxiliaries. She organised voluntary help for St Vincent's in World War II, working in the laundry herself. In 1947 she became the first woman (apart from the mother rectress) on the hospital's advisory council. In 1958 she was named founding member of the council of St Vincent's School of Medical Research, for which she engaged in fund-raising and donated large sums of money of her own for fellowships.

Racehorses
Rita Buxton owned several racehorses. One, High Syce, won the Caulfield Cup in 1929. St Razzle, another, was runner-up in 1949. The Victoria Golf Club instituted a cup in her name, awarded to the winner of an annual match-play tournament, in recognition of her contribution to the club as president (1937–49) of the associates.

Honours
 OBE, 1944
 CBE, 1955
 DBE, 1969

Affiliations
 Australian Red Cross Society (Victoria)
 Alexandra Club

Last years
Following the death of her husband, Buxton retired from the bulk of her hospital work, although she remained a life councillor of St Vincent's and nominal president of the auxiliaries. Survived by her three daughters, she died on 22 August 1982, aged 85.

Sources
 B. Egan, "Ways of a Hospital" (1993)
 The Age (Melbourne), 7 November 1934, page 13, 14 June 1969, page 15
 The Herald (Melbourne), 14 June 1969, page 2
 The Sun News-Pictorial (Melbourne), 1 October 1982, page 11
 The Advocate (Melbourne), 9 September 1982, page 4

References

External links
 Rita Buxton at The Australian Dictionary of Biography
 
 

1896 births
1982 deaths
Australian women philanthropists
Philanthropists from Melbourne
Australian people of German descent
Australian people of Irish descent
Australian Dames Commander of the Order of the British Empire
People from South Yarra, Victoria
Australian activists
20th-century women philanthropists